Maylandia lombardoi, is a  long freshwater fish from the family Cichlidae. This species is popular in the aquarium hobby where it is sold under a variety of common names including: lombardoi mbuna, kenyi mbuna or kennyi mbuna or kenyi cichlid. This species is sometimes seen in the genus Metriaclima owing to a dispute in which a minority of cichlid researchers do not consider Maylandia valid (see Maylandia for discussion. The specific name honours the exotic fish dealer John Lombardo.

Distribution and habitat
It is endemic to the rocky shores of Mbenji Island, Lake Malawi in east Africa. The species is highly sexually dimorphic, females and juvenile males are pale white-blue with several blue-black vertical bands extending into the dorsal fin. Adult males turn bright yellow with faint brown bars crossing the body; fins are plain yellow with egg spots on the anal fin.

In the aquarium
Kenyi cichlids are sold for the aquarium hobby.

Reproduction
Like most mbuna cichlids, this species is a maternal mouthbrooder. When mouthbrooding, females may defend a small territory and assume the colouration of males.

Images of Kenyi cichlids

See also
Mbuna
List of freshwater aquarium fish species

References

 Dick Mills, Aquarium Fish, Dorling Kindersly Books, 2000
 

lombardoi
Fish of Africa
Fish described in 1977
Taxobox binomials not recognized by IUCN